IMASTE  is a Spanish company, and claims to be the leading European provider of virtual events, 3D online environments and virtual tradeshows. They have over 200 customers in 25 different countries for purposes such as marketing, human resources, recruitment and international connectivity.

History
IMASTE was founded with the purpose of bridging the gap between university students and companies in Spain. As a result, they started organizing live job fairs and within two years their Tour de Empleo became Spain's leading university recruitment event.

Since 2014, the company has experience an international expansion with clients in 20 countries.

IMASTE is incorporated in Spain and headquartered in Calle Menorca #3.

References 

Event management companies of Spain